Vat. Ar. abbreviates Vaticani arabi, a collection within the Vatican Library. Notable works within this collection include the following:

Vat. Ar. 5, Psalter in Arabic
Vat. Ar. 182, Al-Razi's Al-Tibb al-Ruhani
Vat. Ar. 204, Naskh-Ottoman Quran manuscript 
Vat. Ar. 230, Quran manuscript
Vat. ar. 319, 13th century diagram of the Tusi couple, by Tusi 
Vat. Ar. 368, The Story of Bayad and Riyad, 13th-century Arabic love story
Vat. ar. 657, Eliya ibn ʿUbaid's  Concordance of Faith 
Vat. Ar. 709, Quran manuscript
Vat. Ar. 782, 16thC copy of Galland Manuscript
Vat. Ar. 924, Quran manuscript, small circle of 45mm diameter, Octagonal case
Vat. Ar. 931, Quran manuscript
Vat. Ar. 1484, Quran manuscript, largest in library, 540x420mm.
Vat. Ar. 1605/1, additional folia to the Codex Parisino-petropolitanus

Manuscripts of the Vatican Library